Patrick Baud, born June 30, 1979, in Avignon, France, is a French graphic designer, writer, presenter, folklorist and videographer.

Biography
After hosting a radio program dedicated to the strange (Exocet) at the end of the 2000s, Patrick Baud created a blog called Axolot in 2009, in which he writes about astonishing facts and various historical and scientific curiosities. His first book, L’homme qui sauva le monde et autres sources d’étonnement, was published in 2012. This book contains articles from his blog and some new stories. A second book, 20 inconnus au destin hors du commun dont vous n’avez jamais entendu parler avant, was published by AAARG! in June 2014.

François Theurel, known online as "Le Fossoyeur de Films" urged Patrick Baud, with whom he was sharing an apartment, to start making videos. Thus, starting June 2013, Axolot also became a web documentary channel on YouTube, where his videos have been viewed more than ten million times. Patrick Baud explains his success by man's fascination for the strange: "I think what people like, is to realize how wonderful, astonishing this world is. Plus, I do work a lot on the popularization and pedagogy, in particular on all scientific subjects so it can be understood by all." Axolot, a comic adapting a few of these stories and illustrated by twelve different artists, was published in October 2014 by Delcourt. The second volume was released in November 2015, illustrated by a new team of artists, but still in the form of a Cabinet of Curiosities.

Patrick Baud also presented a conference during the "Vulgarizators" event in the École normale supérieure de Lyon, and a TEDx conference at the Institut national des sciences appliquées de Lyon.
	
In November 2015, he created "la veillée" with Damien Maric. This was an event inspired by the American concept of "The Moth", where participants come to tell extraordinary stories. In September 2016, he was co-organizer of the "Frames Festival" in Avignon, a convention dedicated to YouTubers.

In November 2016, Patrick Baud published the third volume of the Axolot comic, and a new book called Terre Secrète, published by Dunod, co-written with the geologist Charles Frankel and dedicated to the unknown and astounding wonders of nature.

On March 31, 2017, Patrick Baud launched a crowdfunding campaign through Ulule to finance his documentary travel series Etranges Escales. The main objective was reached in three hours.

Books
 L'Homme qui sauva le monde et autres sources d'étonnement, éd. lulu.com, 2012 
 20 inconnus au destin hors du commun dont vous n'avez jamais entendu parler avant (drawn by Gwen Tomahawk), éd. AAARG!, 2014 
 Terre Secrète (in collaboration with Charles Frankel), éd. Dunod, 2016 
 Lieux secrets – Merveilles insolites de l'humanité  , éd. Dunod, November 2, 2017

Comic books
 Axolot
Tome 1 (scénario), éd. Delcourt, 2014 
Tome 2 (scénario), éd. Delcourt, 2015 
Tome 3 (scénario), éd. Delcourt, 2016 
Tome 4 (scénario), éd. Delcourt, 2017

Web shows
 2005–2007 : Exocet (presenter with Thomas Bry and Mickaël Icard)
 2013 : Axolot (YouTube channel about the strange and mysterious) : 
 2013 : Axolot (writer, presenter, director) : various episodes about fascinating subjects
 2014 : Étranges escales (writer, presenter, director) : astonishing and unknown places in famous cities around the world
 2014 : Histoires de nuit (presenter, director)
 2016 : Les Axoportraits (writer, presenter, director) : episodes dedicated to unknown people with wonderful destinies

References 

1979 births
Living people
French graphic designers
French folklorists
Videographers